
This is a list of the National Register of Historic Places listings in West Denver, Colorado.

This is intended to be a complete list of the properties and districts on the National Register of Historic Places in western Denver, Colorado, United States. West Denver is defined as being all of the city west of the South Platte River. The locations of National Register properties and districts may be seen in an online map.

There are 304 properties and districts listed on the National Register in Denver. West Denver includes 46 of these properties and districts, including 2 that extend into other regions; the city's remaining properties and districts are listed elsewhere. Another property was once listed but has been removed.

Current listings

|}

Former listing

|}

See also
List of National Historic Landmarks in Colorado
National Register of Historic Places listings in Denver, Colorado

References

West